Angela Merkel was first elected in 2005 as the Chancellor of Germany and was reelected three times since then in 2009, 2013, and 2018. She has been named Time Magazine's Person of the Year in 2015, ranked #1 for Power Women 2020, #4 on Powerful People 2018 by Forbes, and awarded countless honorary doctorates including from Harvard University in May 2019. Merkel herself earned her first doctorate in 1986 in quantum chemistry. In 2005, she became the first female and first East German Chancellor of Germany. Her nickname “Mutti Merkel" or Mother Merkel reflects her decades-long role as a compassionate and thoughtful leader in Germany. The following article intends to reflect on Merkel's identity, life experiences, and notable events that have shaped her public image.

Background and identity

As a migrant 
Merkel was born in 1954 in Hamburg, Germany. Amid the Cold War, her father moved the family from West Germany to the Deutsche Demokratische Republik (DDR). She described her upbringing in East Germany as ‘comfortable’ because of the lack of control over life decisions. At times, Merkel has emphasized and hidden her background as an ‘Ossi,’ a term used by West Germans to describe Germans from the East. Scholars attribute Merkel's ability to remain diplomatic and neutral in part to the history of growing up in the DDR and fearing retribution from the Stasi.

A preacher's daughter 
Merkel grew up with a strong Protestant influence from her father, who became a pastor before moving the family to the DDR. The Chancellor's Protestant upbringing was visible in her early years on the political stage. She lived a frugal lifestyle, working behind the scenes and avoiding political power-grabbing. Her established moral compass continued guiding her throughout various events in which she had to make tradeoffs between public opinion and human dignity. The most notable being the 2015 refugee crisis, where Merkel made Germany a European leader in the number of refugees accepted. She forged her own 'moral leadership' which wrestles with the balance between what is right versus what is politically favorable

As a scientist 
Still living in the GDR, Merkel studied physics and graduated from the Karl Marx University in 1978 with a degree in physics and physical chemistry. In 1986, she continued her education and received a Ph.D. in quantum chemistry. Merkel continued her work in the sciences at the ‘Akademie der Wissenschaften’ (Academy of Sciences) from 1978 to 1990, where she was one of the few female researchers. Scholars note that Merkel used her career in the sciences to avoid the East German regime; a career in politics may not have afforded her this luxury. Merkel did not transition into politics until her thirties, when she utilized her acquired expertise in her future cabinet positions, including Minister of Environment. Most recently, her background has been seen as an asset for Germany during the COVID-19 pandemic.

As a woman in politics 
When Merkel began her political journey in the 1990s, she was one of the first women in domestic politics seen in leadership positions, particularly in her conservative party. As she climbed the ranks in the CDU, she became known as Helmut Kohl's "little girl" despite Merkel being in her thirties and having an established scientific and political career. Merkel gained prominence as a female politician without running ‘as a woman.’ Still, regardless of how Merkel frames herself, the public hasn't hesitated to draw conclusions based on her gender. The usual sexist coverage followed her, including an analysis of her hairstyles and wardrobe. However, when Merkel stepped down as the party leader and announced she would not seek reelection in 2021, she has become more vocal on women's issues, including the gender pay gap and representation in politics. Yet, she remains opposed to calling herself a feminist, suggesting that she would prefer to be known for her leadership outside of her gender identity. Merkel continues to transcend gender identity and strives to be noted for her accomplishments.

Political image 
Merkel joined her party, the Christian Democratic Union (CDU), a center-right party when Germany was first reunited. She served as the Minister of Women and Youth (1991–94), Minister for Environment (1994–98), and the CDU Chair (2000-2018). She won her first term as a Chancellor in 2005 and won three subsequent campaigns in 2009, 2013, and 2018. For comparison, Merkel has continued to lead Germany through four US Presidents, five UK Prime Ministers, four French Presidents, and seven Italian PMs. Merkel's years in leadership were marked by financial, institutional, immigration, and public health crises. Despite the tumultuous times, she has continued to symbolize stability and sanity for Germany and the world. As of January 2021, Statistica reported 84% approved of Angela Merkel's overall leadership and work as Chancellor Merkel will leave her office with a legacy of consistently thoughtful leadership, giving Germany a favorable position in the new world order, being the first female and first East German elected as Chancellor. The following section will detail Merkel's political image.

Mutti Merkel 
The reliance on Merkel and her consistent leadership has grown since her first election in 2005. Her reputation as ‘Mutti Merkel’ or Mother Merkel encompasses the idea that she is a dependable and trustworthy figure. The nickname was first introduced as a patronizing term used by her opponents to characterize her as a ‘nagging mother.’ Her party and supporters rebranded the name as a term of endearment and honor. Today, her brand of being ‘Mutti’ encompasses centrist policies with her moral compass guiding her through crises. At times this has meant being a rigid leader, as in the 2008 Euro Crisis. In other circumstances, like the 2015 Refugee Crisis, she has pushed for humanity and compassion.

‘Merkeln’ 
A less flattering characteristic that has marked Merkel's Chancellorship includes indecisiveness or an inability to make your own opinions. Merkel's indecision became such a trademark of her, that the verb ‘Merkeln’ in German won ‘Jungendwort’ or Youth Word of the year in 2015. This assessment may be unfair to the Chancellor's leadership as a whole, however, the Chancellor has always maintained a certain level of trepidation when considering the consequences of her actions.

Notable events

2007 meeting with Putin 
The two leaders met to discuss energy supplies in 2007 in Sochi. The event should have been unremarkable however the dynamic changed when the Russian President invited Koni, his 8-year-old Labrador Retriever dog, to join the two. Merkel has a known fear of dogs and was visibly uncomfortable in the situation. Her reaction is what caught the attention of reporters; the Chancellor responded to Putin saying “It doesn’t eat journalists, after all.”. After the event she took control of the narrative; “I understand why he has to do this – to prove he’s a man. … He’s afraid of his own weakness. Russia has nothing, no successful politics or economy. All they have is this.”.

2008 Euro crisis 
The European financial crisis was a monumental undertaking for the first-term chancellor. Numerous Eurozone countries were unable to pay their government debts independently, putting the other countries in the zone at risk. The European Union had to take action to avoid further financial ruin; the question was, what was the right ‘bailout’ package. During this crisis, Merkel gained her reputation as a leader of Europe; “Merkel was forced to look beyond just Germany’s interests and to assume leadership in Europe. She has received criticism regarding the ‘flawed’ Greek bailout package that opposed austerity and seemed to benefit the German banking sector. Her science background provides insight into how Merkel worked to find a solution for the Union at the time. She deliberated and took her time to assess the complexity of the situation. However, the hesitancy to act sooner is what scholars say propelled Greece and the Euro into a deeper hole.

2013 NSA spying 
In 2013, reports indicated that the US National Security Agency under President Obama had hacked and spied on European leaders, including the Chancellor herself. Obama reportedly connected with Merkel directly and assured her the allegations were completely false. The outrage in Europe was present, and Merkel was quoted saying, “spying among friends - that simply isn’t done. ". The event hits close to home for Merkel, growing up in East Germany during the Cold War, where spying on friends was a common fear. She is reported to have reminded Obama of this fact stating, “we’re not in the Cold War anymore”. The event did not prevent the two leaders from working together, but it inspired proposals for EU legislation against the transfer of digital data between Europe and America.

2015 Person of the Year 
Time Magazine announced Angela Merkel Person of the Year as the “Chancellor of the Free World”. This award came in Merkel's 10th year in office, a year marked by political and humanitarian turmoil. Greece was on the verge of bankruptcy again, and the number of refugees fleeing to the shores of Europe had grown to an uncontrollable scale. A reported 911,000 refugees made the journey in 2015 alone, fleeing civil war, conflict, and poverty mainly from Afghanistan, Syria, and Iraq. As countries started to close their borders, Merkel committed to accepting one million refugees with her famous words “wir schaffen das” or “we can do this” even as her popularity dropped. The Chancellor faced criticism throughout the EU where a Hungarian spokesperson said, “the Germans think they’re the Americans of Europe.” Time Magazine noted that Merkel's leadership during the crisis was influenced by her background both as a migrant from former East Germany and her religious upbringing, which acted as a moral compass that favored humanity over political popularity. Her fast action to welcome the refugees is what the magazine evaluated for the 2015 title. Time concluded their nomination of Merkel writing, “Merkel’s legacy—her bold, fraught, immensely empathetic act of leadership—challenges more than the comfort of European life.

2017 meeting with Trump 
Angela Merkel visited the White House in March 2017 for the first time during Donald Trump’s presidency. The visit was long anticipated as the politicians shared very different views regarding their future transatlantic relations. The tensions seemed to culminate as the two world leaders sat in the Oval Office, where body language experts noted a certain awkwardness. When several reporters asked the two to get a picture shaking hands, Merkel leaned in to offer her hand, and President Trump seemed to ignore the question. Whether or not this was the intention is disputed; however, it did allow for speculation of the leader’s future relationship. Regardless of the media speculation, the event did not seem to shake Merkel; she is well-versed in meeting US Presidents, Trump being the third one. Merkel’s role on the world stage has never been to emphasize differences but maintain diplomacy; “I seek cooperation rather than confrontation.”.

2020 Covid crisis 
Merkel's science background has undoubtedly prepared her to manage the COVID-19 pandemic. From when the virus first reached Germany at the beginning of 2020, the Chancellor continuously held press conferences to understand the virus and keep information accessible. She even went viral for giving a live lecture explaining the ‘R0’ factor during one of her press conferences, where she reminded her constituents that their Chancellor obtained a Ph.D. in quantum chemistry before joining politics. Germany has practiced caution throughout the pandemic remaining in a strict lockdown since the resurgence of the second wave in Fall 2020. Merkel's scientific rationale, coupled with her emotional appeal, has allowed her to maintain a high approval rating .

References 

Angela Merkel
Merkel, Angela